The Eclipse of Ages into Black is the debut full-length studio album by American extreme metal band Goatwhore. It was released on February 22, 2000.

Track listing

Credits 
Ben Falgoust – vocals
Sammy Duet – guitars
Ben Stout – guitars
Pat Bruders – bass
Zak Nolan – drums

References

Goatwhore albums
2000 debut albums